Bick may refer to:

People
Charity Bick (1925-2002), George Medal recipient
Charles O. Bick (1909-1994), Canadian administrator
Donald Bick (1936-1992), British cricketer
Eckhard Bick (born 1958), German linguist
Esther Bick (1902-1983), Polish psychologist
Ilsa J. Bick, American author
Jacob Samuel Bick (1772-1831), Austrian author
Jamie Bick (born 2000), German actress
Patrick Bick (born 1977), German footballer
Sam Bick (born 1955), American soccer player
Bick Campbell (1898-1967), American baseball umpire

Other uses
 Bick's Pickle, Canadian food brand
 Members of the Rapoport-Bick (rabbinic dynasty) who used Bick as their last name, often alone
 Anvil

See also
Alexander Bicks (1901-1963), American judge
Jenny Bicks, American television producer
Bicks Ndoni (1958-2020), South African politician
 Bic (disambiguation)
 Bik (disambiguation)
 Moore-Bick, a surname